Rogues' Regiment is a 1948 film noir action film directed by Robert Florey and starring Dick Powell, Märta Torén, and Vincent Price. It is the first American feature film to be set in the First Indochina War.

Plot
An American Intelligence Agent and Nazi hunter is on the trail of a former SS war criminal reminiscent of Martin Bormann believed to be hiding in the French Foreign Legion in French Indochina.  He joins forces with a  French Intelligence agent investigating supplies of weapons to the Việt Minh from the Eastern Bloc.

Cast
 Dick Powell as Whit Corbett 
 Märta Torén as Lili Maubert
 Vincent Price as Mark Van Ratten 
 Stephen McNally as Martin Bruener a.k.a. Carl Reicher 
 Edgar Barrier as Colonel Mauclaire 
 Henry Rowland as Erich Otto Heindorf 
 Carol Thurston as Li-Ho-Kay  
 James Millican as Cobb 
 Richard Loo as Kao Pang 
 Philip Ahn as Tran Duy Gian 
 Richard Fraser as Rycroft
 Otto Reichow as Stein
 Kenny Washington as Sam Latch
 Dennis Dengate as O'Hara
 Frank Conroy as Colonel Lemercier
 Martin Garralaga as Hazeret
 James Nolan as American Colonel (James F. Nolan)
 Paul Coze as French Commander (also acted as film's technical adviser)

Production
Max Ophüls was hoping to direct the film but was passed over in favour of Robert Florey.<ref>p.200 Bacher, Lutz Max Ophuls in the Hollywood Studios  1996 Rutgers University Press</ref>

The film was first announced in November 1947 with writer-producer Robert Buckner saying he was inspired by stories of former Nazis enlisting in the French Foreign Legion. In particular he researched the disappearance of Martin Bormann.

Edmond O'Brien was originally announced as star. It was made shortly after the production of another film about the French Foreign Legion, Outpost in Morocco. Burt Lancaster was sought for a supporting part.

In March 1948 it was announced Universal signed Dick Powell to play the lead. Edmond O'Brien dropped out of the film to make a movie with Deanna Durbin.

It was meant to be the 60th film directed by Robert Florey at Universal.

Release
The Los Angeles Times said the film had an "arresting premise" which "went the way of just another cops and robbers chase".The New York Times wrote that "if this man-hunt for a vicious, top-flight Nazi in the environs of Saigon bears more than a passing resemblance to a dozen other film chases of recent vintage, mark it down as topical, at least. If credibility is by-passed more than once, it is all done briskly and with good will."

Adaptation
In 1951 Dick Powell reprised his role in a radio adaptation of the film on Screen Directors Playhouse''.

References

External links

Complete film at Internet Archive
Radio adaptation at Internet Archive

1948 films
1940s action thriller films
1940s English-language films
Films directed by Robert Florey
Universal Pictures films
Films set in Vietnam
Films about the French Foreign Legion
American black-and-white films
First Indochina War films
Films about Nazi hunters
American exploitation films
Films scored by Daniele Amfitheatrof
American action thriller films
Film noir
1940s American films